Momen may refer to:

Nurul Momen (1908–1990), (Sobriquet:- Natyaguru) professor, educationist, pioneer playwright & director, Author, Translator, Broadcaster, Satirist, personal essay pioneer in Bangladesh
Mohamed Abd Al Momen Ankba, Sudanese footballer
Karl Momen, Swedish architect, painter and sculptor
Mohammad Momen (born 1940), Faqih and member of the Guardian Council of the Islamic Republic of Iran
Moojan Momen, scholar of Bahá'í and Shi'i studies
Tarek Momen (born 1988), professional squash player who represented Egypt

See also
Ittan-momen, a Tsukumogami formed from a roll of cotton in Japanese myth
Mo'men
Momoen